Simeku is a South Bougainville language spoken in the mountains of southern Bougainville Province, Papua New Guinea.

References

Languages of the Autonomous Region of Bougainville
South Bougainville languages